The 2022 Wigan Metropolitan Borough Council election took place on 5 May 2022 to elect members of Wigan Metropolitan Borough Council in England. This election was held on the same day as other local elections. A by-election was held on the same day in Leigh East ward to fill the seat left vacant by the death of Labour councillor Anita Thorpe.

Overview

Results Summary

Results

Bolton West constituency

Atherton ward

Leigh constituency

Astley Mosley Common ward

Atherleigh ward

Golborne and Lowton West ward

Leigh East ward

Leigh South ward

Leigh West ward

Lowton East ward

Tyldesley ward

Makerfield constituency

Abram ward

Ashton ward

Bryn ward

Hindley ward

Hindley Green ward

Orrell ward

Winstanley ward

Worsley Mesnes ward

Wigan constituency

Aspull, New Springs and Whelley ward

Douglas ward

Ince ward

Pemberton ward

Shevington with Lower Ground ward

Standish with Langtree ward

The "Standish Independents" description was used at the last election by the same candidate, but standing for the Wigan Independents, a separate political party.

Wigan Central ward

Wigan West ward

By-elections between 2022 and 2023

Ashton ward

References

Wigan
Wigan Council elections